Fire Station No. 2, also known as El Mecca Shrine Club, is a historic building located in Waterloo, Iowa, United States.  The city's paid fire department dates from 1904.  Prior to that Waterloo was served by private fire companies.  Built in 1907, this is the only early fire station left in the city.  This building is an eclectic combination of the Renaissance Revival and the Romanesque Revival styles.  It was designed by the prominent Waterloo architect John G. Ralston. The decorative elements on the main floor are found in the columns with foliated capitals that support a broad entablature.  The second story is primarily brick with lighter stone accents for a polychromatic effect.  The building was used as a fire station until 1969 when the city built five new stations. Black Hawk County used the building as an office to issue food stamps. El Mecca Shrine acquired the building in 1976 and converted it into a restaurant and club.  It was listed on the National Register of Historic Places in 1988.

References

Fire stations completed in 1907
Renaissance Revival architecture in Iowa
Romanesque Revival architecture in Iowa
Buildings and structures in Waterloo, Iowa
National Register of Historic Places in Black Hawk County, Iowa
Fire stations on the National Register of Historic Places in Iowa
Shriners